The 2nd FINA Open Water Swimming World Championships were held September 23-28, 2002 in Sharm el-Sheikh, Egypt. The championships featured 89 swimmers from 26 countries competing in 6 races:
5-kilometer (5K)--Men's and Women's
10-kilometer (10K)--Men's and Women's
25-kilometer (25K)--Men's and Women's

Results

Team medals

See also
2000 FINA World Open Water Swimming Championships
2004 FINA World Open Water Swimming Championships

References

External links
HistoFINA--Open Water: FINA's history of open water swimming events.

FINA World Open Water Swimming Championships
Fina World Open Water Swimming Championships, 2002
Fina World Open Water Swimming Championships, 2002
International aquatics competitions hosted by Egypt
Swimming competitions in Egypt